Siegbert Einstein (25 October 1889, Bad Buchau – 24 December 1968, Riedlingen) was a German-Jewish politician, factory worker, civil servant, lawyer, Holocaust survivor, and the last Jew who lived in the Jewish community in Bad Buchau.

Early life 

Siegbert Einstein was born in Bad Buchau on 25 October 1889, the second son of Martin Einstein & Sally Dreyfus Einstein and the great-nephew of Albert Einstein.

Career 
Einstein joined the German Army as a reserve lieutenant in the Reserve Infantry Regiment No. 51 of the Württemberg Army. He fought in World War I and was awarded the Iron Cross 1st Class and the Friedrich Order.
 
He worked at Schussenrieder Street, 29. Soon afterwards he started operating in a fabric factory under the name "Einstein & Erlanger". The business was partly owned by his family and closed in 1938; Einstein had to work as a factory worker at a butter factory in Riedlingen. 

On 21 February 1945, he was deported to Theresienstadt concentration camp, but he survived and returned to Bad Buchau in late June 1945, now in the French occupation zone. 

In September 1946, Einstein wrote a letter on the transport of the Jews taken to Stuttgart in 1942, he reports that he accompanied the transport to Stuttgart, he cared for the victims and also counted them. In April 1947, Einstein wrote another letter regarding the transport to Theresienstadt in 1942, that the Nazi paramedics had sent some of their relatives and acquaintances to the concentration camp. The 270 Jews who lived in the city of Buchau were deported in the Holocaust; only Einstein and three others returned to the city after the war. 

In September 1946, Einstein was elected deputy mayor of Bad Buchau.

Einstein planted a weeping willow in 1951, and the space was opened to the public. Today the space belongs to Jost Einstein, Siegbert's grandson, who is the director of the Center for Nature Conservation of Bad Buchau.

Personal life 
After the end of the war, Siegbert married Elsa Schlittler; because she was an Aryan, Siegbert had additional privileges under the Nazis. They had two children, Rolf Einstein and Kurt Einstein, who were raised Protestant Christians. He was a distant relative of Albert Einstein.

He died on 24 December 1968 at the age of 79 and was the last Jew buried in the Jewish Cemetery of Buchau.

Awards and honors 
In 1959, Einstein received the Order of Merit because of his public work and efforts in the care of the Jewish community.

Bibliography 
Charlotte Mayenberger: Juden in Buchau. (Landkreis Biberach – Geschichte und Kultur, Band 8), Federsee-Verlag, Bad Buchau 2008.
Joseph Mohn, Der Leidensweg unter dem Hakenkreuz. Aus der Geschichte von Stadt und Stift Buchau am Federsee, hrsg. von der Stadt Bad Buchau, Bad Buchau 1970.

Notes

References

External links 
Buchauer Nachrichten [PDF] (in German)
La Shoah en Europe (in French)
Buchau — An Extinct Jewish Community. p. 7
Findagrave.com

1889 births
1968 deaths
German Army personnel of World War I
Jewish German politicians
Theresienstadt Ghetto survivors
Siegbert
20th-century German businesspeople
20th-century German politicians
People from Biberach (district)
Officers Crosses of the Order of Merit of the Federal Republic of Germany